The River Rea is a small river that flows through south east Shropshire, England.

Course
It passes just to the east of the small market town of Cleobury Mortimer and just south of the Hamlet (place) of Neen Savage, before entering the Teme at Newnham Bridge in Worcestershire. Its waters eventually reach the Bristol Channel, via the Severn. The upper stretch of the river is known as the Rea Brook (not to be confused with the Rea Brook which flows from Marton Pool to the River Severn in Shrewsbury). For a short stretch between Cleobury Mortimer and Neen Sollars the river forms part of the Shropshire-Worcestershire border.

It is crossed (at ) by the Elan aqueduct.

Etymology
The name of the river derives from a root found in many Indo-European languages and means "to run" or "to flow".

The historic or alternative name for the river is the River Neen and there are three settlements along its course which take its name: Neen Sollars, Neenton and Neen Savage.

References

External links

Rivers of Shropshire
1Rea